Infini is a 2015 science fiction film.

Infini may also refer to:

 Infini (album), Voivod album
 Infini (CRS), a Japanese computer reservations system

See also

Infinity (disambiguation)
Ẽfini, brand of Japanese car producer Mazda